Stranger from Santa Fe is a 1945 American Western film directed by Lambert Hillyer and written by Adele Buffington. This is the sixteenth film in the "Marshal Nevada Jack McKenzie" series, and stars Johnny Mack Brown as Jack McKenzie and Raymond Hatton as his sidekick Sandy Hopkins, with Beatrice Gray, Joan Curtis, Jimmy Martin and Jack Ingram. The film was released on May 15, 1945, by Monogram Pictures.

Cast          
Johnny Mack Brown as Nevada McKenzie aka Roy Ferris
Raymond Hatton as Sandy Hopkins
Beatrice Gray as Marcia Earley
Joan Curtis as Beth Grimes 
Jimmy Martin as Dan Murray 
Jack Ingram as Ned Grimes
John Merton as Cy Manning
Tom Quinn as Bill
Steve Clark as Sheriff
Jack Rockwell as Stagecoach Driver
Bud Osborne as Clint
Hal Price as Hymer

References

External links

American Western (genre) films
1945 Western (genre) films
Monogram Pictures films
Films directed by Lambert Hillyer
American black-and-white films
1940s American films
1940s English-language films